Pacific Egret is an INF Class 3 nuclear waste carrier launched in January 2010.

Construction
Pacific Egret was built by Mitsui Engineering and Shipbuilding, Tamano, Japan. She was launched on 12 January 2010. Her homeport is Barrow in Furness, Cumbria.

It was purpose-built to carry plutonium, highly-enriched uranium and mixed-oxide nuclear fuel. It is fitted with naval guns, cannons and other means of repelling assaults.

References

2010 ships
Ships built by Mitsui Engineering and Shipbuilding
Radioactive waste